Stuff Like That There is the fourteenth full-length album by American indie rock band Yo La Tengo, released in August 2015 by record label Matador.

Content 

On this album, the band revisits the original concept of their 1990 album Fakebook with a mix of cover songs, "covers" of Yo La Tengo songs, and brand new originals.

Reception

At Metacritic, which assigns a normalized rating out of 100 to reviews from mainstream critics, Stuff Like That There received an average score of 74, based on 28 reviews, indicating "generally favorable reviews". Reviewer Mark Deming of AllMusic commented that "If Stuff Like That There isn't as revelatory as Fakebook, it's a splendid, beguiling album that's perfectly suited for late nights and rainy afternoons, and a welcome reminder of one of the many, many things Yo La Tengo do so well." In his review for The Guardian, Ben Thompson asked whether another Yo La Tengo covers record was really needed and concluded that "[t]he answer to that question appears to be yes." NME reviewer Noel Gardner said that the band had "honed their approach to a point where they can't really sound like anyone except themselves", which he said was "key to the deep likeability" of the record. Critic Stuart Berman of Pitchfork said that "taken as a whole, the record stands as a loving portrait of Yo La Tengo's vast musical and social universe condensed into a small wooden frame. And at a time when the full-album experience is giving way to the almighty playlist, Stuff Like That There handily reasserts Yo La Tengo's reputation as indie rock’s consummate curators." Robert Christgau named it the second best album of 2015 in his ballot for The Village Voices annual Pazz & Jop critics poll.

Track listing

Charts

References

External links 

2015 albums
Covers albums
Matador Records albums
Yo La Tengo albums